Robert Neill may refer to:
Robert Neill (American politician) (1838–1907), U.S. Representative from Arkansas
Robert Neill (Australian footballer) (born 1974), former Australian rules footballer
Robert Neill (cricketer) (1864–1930), New Zealand cricketer
Robert Miln Neill (1882–1914), Scottish rugby player
Robert W. Neill (1853–1928), Scottish footballer (Queen's Park FC and Scotland)
Bob Neill (born 1952), British politician
Robert Neill (writer) (1905–1979), British writer of historical fiction
 Bobby Neill (born 1933), Scottish boxer
 Bobby Neill (footballer) (1875–1913), Scottish footballer

See also
Robert Neale (disambiguation)
Bob Neal (disambiguation)
Robert O'Neill (disambiguation)
Neil Roberts (disambiguation)